The 15th National Television Awards ceremony was held at The O2 Arena for the first time on 20 January 2010, and was the first to be hosted by Dermot O'Leary.

Awards

References

National Television Awards
National Television Awards
National Television Awards
2010 in London
National Television Awards
National Television Awards